Salvia guaranitica, the anise-scented sage or hummingbird sage, is a species of flowering plant in the sage family Lamiaceae, native to a wide area of South America, including Brazil, Paraguay, Uruguay, and Argentina. It is cultivated all over the world, and is naturalized in New Zealand and Chile.

Description
In cold regions, flowering begins in mid summer and continues until frost.

Cultivation
Salvia guaranitica is a popular ornamental plant in mild areas. It grows in either full or three quarter sunlight, in well-drained soil. Numerous cultivars have been selected, including 'Argentine Skies' (pale blue flowers), 'Black and Blue' (very dark violet blue calyx), 'Blue Ensign' (large blue flowers), and 'Purple Splendor' (Light purple flowers). The cultivar 'Blue Enigma', with pure blue flowers, has gained the Royal Horticultural Society's Award of Garden Merit.

References

External links

 UBC Botanical Gardens photo page

guaranitica
Flora of Brazil
Flora of Argentina
Flora of Paraguay
Flora of Uruguay